The 2009 Men's African Volleyball Championship is played in Tétouan, Morocco, from 27 September 2009 to 5 October with 9 teams participating in the continental championship.

Teams

Preliminary round

Group A

Group B

Final round

Semifinals

Bronze medal match

Final

Classification 5th–8th

Final Standing

External links
 Results

2009 Men
African championship, Men
African volleyball championship, Men
Men's African Volleyball Championship
International volleyball competitions hosted by Morocco